Edgar Armando Olvera Higuera (born 20 April 1969) is a Mexican politician affiliated with the National Action Party. As of 2014 he served as Deputy of the LX Legislature of the Mexican Congress representing the State of Mexico. In 2016, he was elected mayor of Naucalpan, a city and municipality located just northwest of Mexico City, for a three-year period (2016-2018). In March 2018, he was awarded permanent license from his position as mayor by local Congress in order to participate in the 2018 Election as candidate for the 29th Local District Deputy.

References

1969 births
Living people
Politicians from the State of Mexico
National Action Party (Mexico) politicians
21st-century Mexican politicians
Members of the Chamber of Deputies (Mexico) for the State of Mexico